Lunca Ilvei is a commune in Bistrița-Năsăud County, Transylvania, Romania. It is composed of a single village, Lunca Ilvei.

Natives
Anuța Cătună

References

Communes in Bistrița-Năsăud County
Localities in Transylvania